Dean Scofield (born January 12, 1957, Alhambra, California) is an American actor who has provided the voice of the recurring joke character Johnny Sasaki in Metal Gear Solid, Metal Gear Solid: The Twin Snakes and Metal Gear Solid 2: Sons of Liberty, but was not brought back for Metal Gear Solid 4: Guns of the Patriots.
 
He was credited as Dino Schofield in Metal Gear Solid because he (as did numerous other voice actors for Metal Gear Solid) thought that the union would not support the work on the game. Scofield also played the role of Veronica's nephew and Archie Bunker's gay waiter Fred Rooney in the sitcom television series Archie Bunker's Place. His final appearance from Archie Bunker's Place was in the episode "Archie Fixes Up Fred".

References

External links 

1957 births
Living people
American male film actors
American male television actors
American male voice actors
People from Los Angeles
20th-century American male actors